{{Infobox song
| name       = My Machine
| cover      =
| alt        =
| type       = single
| artist     = Princess Superstar
| album      =
| released   = October 2005
| format     =
| recorded   =
| studio     =
| venue      =
| genre      = Hip-hop
| length     =
| label      = K7
| writer     = Concetta Kirschner, Stuart Price
| producer   =
| prev_title = 'Perfect (EP)'
| prev_year  = 2005
| next_title = Perfect (Exceeder)'
| next_year  = 2006
}}

"My Machine" is the title song, and third single, from the latest Princess Superstar'' album.

Track listing
VINYL
 "My Machine (Album Version)"
 "My Machine (Junior Sanchez Remix)"
 "My Machine (Tommie Sunshine's Brooklyn Fire Re-touch)"
 "Sex, Drugs & Drugs"

CD
 "My Machine (Alexander Technique Radio Edit)"
 "My Machine (Album Version)"
 "My Machine (Junior Sanchez Remix)"

Princess Superstar songs
2005 singles
Songs written by Stuart Price
2005 songs
Songs written by Princess Superstar